Gavan Desmond Moran (4 March 1936 – 1 April 1983) was an Australian rules footballer who played with Geelong in the Victorian Football League (VFL).

His older brother Bernie Moran played for Carlton a few years earlier.

Notes

External links 

1936 births
1983 deaths
Australian rules footballers from Victoria (Australia)
Geelong Football Club players
Cobden Football Club players